The 2007–08 Louisiana–Lafayette Ragin' Cajuns women's basketball team represented the University of Louisiana at Lafayette during the 2007–08 NCAA Division I women's basketball season. The Ragin' Cajuns were led by first-year head coach Errol Rogers; they played their double-header home games at the Cajundome with other games at the Earl K. Long Gymnasium, which is located on campus. They were members in the Sun Belt Conference. They finished the season 8–22, 4–14 in Sun Belt play to finish dead-last (seventh place) in the West Division. They were eliminated in the first round of the Sun Belt women's tournament.

Previous season 
The Ragin' Cajuns finished the 2006–07 season 26–9, –14 in Sun Belt play to finish in as Sun Belt West Divisional Champions. They were invited to the oost-season conference tournament, where they made it to the championship before losing by 10 points to the Middle Tennessee Blue Raiders women's basketball.  They would go on to be invited to the 2007 NCAA Division I women's basketball tournament where they would lose to Marquette by the score of 58–87.  This was the only time a Ragin' Cajuns women's basketball team has made it to March Madness.  This would also be J. Kelly Hall's last season at the helm of the program, as he was hired by the Cincinnati Bearcats following the season.  Hall's tenure was arguably the most successful in Cajuns' history, including two divisional titles, the winningest season in program history, as well as winning seasons in each of his years.

Roster

Schedule and results

|-
!colspan=6 style=| Non–conference regular season

|-
!colspan=6 style=| Sun Belt regular season

|-
!colspan=6 style=| Non–conference regular season

|-
!colspan=6 style=| Sun Belt regular season

|-
!colspan=6 style=| Sun Belt Women's Tournament

See also
 2007–08 Louisiana–Lafayette Ragin' Cajuns men's basketball team

References

Louisiana Ragin' Cajuns women's basketball seasons
Louisiana-Lafayette
Louisiana
Louisiana